"Party Train" is a 1983 song by The Gap Band, released on their seventh album, Gap Band V: Jammin'. It peaked at #3 on the R&B charts. The original release had "I'm Ready (If You're Ready)" on the A-side and "Party Train" on the B-side. Later, "Party Train was placed on the A-side, and a special dance mix was placed on the B-side.

Music video
The song's music video starts with the three Wilson brothers driving onto a crowded boardwalk. It then cuts to random people dancing in a boxing ring. During this segment, it periodically cuts back to other people on the boardwalk and beach dancing, including Charlie wading in the ocean water in a speedo. The video ends with an unidentified person filling in a giant yellow ballot (which says "fill in the gap" at the bottom) and selecting "Gap Party" over "Democratic Party" and "Republican Party". Charlie is then tackled and falls into the water.
It was directed by Don Letts.

Chart positions

References

1983 singles
The Gap Band songs
Songs written by Lonnie Simmons
Songs written by Charlie Wilson (singer)
Songs written by Rudy Taylor
1982 songs
Music videos directed by Don Letts